Ghost Town Riders is a 1938 American Western film written and directed by George Waggner. The film stars Bob Baker, Fay McKenzie, Hank Worden, George Cleveland, Forrest Taylor and Glenn Strange. The film was released on December 16, 1938, by Universal Pictures.

Plot

Cast        
Bob Baker as Bob Martin
Fay McKenzie as Molly Taylor 
Hank Worden as Tom 'Cherokee' Walton
George Cleveland as Judge Stillwell
Forrest Taylor as Gomer
Glenn Strange as Tex
Jack Kirk as Slim 
Martin Turner as Rosebud
Reed Howes as Fred 
Murdock MacQuarrie as Harry Branson

References

External links
 

1938 films
American Western (genre) films
1938 Western (genre) films
Universal Pictures films
Films directed by George Waggner
American black-and-white films
1930s English-language films
1930s American films